Heracleides was a tyrant or ruler of Leontini at the time when Pyrrhus of Epirus landed in Sicily, in 278 BC. He was one of the first to offer submission to that monarch.

Notes

4th-century BC Greek people
Sicilian Greeks
Sicilian tyrants